Anatoly Mikhailovich (Mikhaylovich) Kashpirovsky (born 1939) is a Russian psychotherapist of Ukrainian origin, claimed to be a hypnotist and a psychic healer. He enjoyed great popularity in the Soviet Union. Around 2010 he was again performing mass healing rituals in front of large audiences, although he never returned to his former popularity.

Biography 
Born in Khmelnytskyi, Ukraine, USSR, Kashpirovsky graduated from the Vinnitskiy Medical Institute in 1962.  After this, he worked for 25 years as a psychiatrist in a psychiatric hospital.

He became famous in 1989 after several of his sessions with patients were shown on Soviet television.  Among other things, he was shown to remove the pain of two patients who remained conscious during abdominal surgery by addressing them by teleconferencing. The first session was shown on 9 October 1989 on the Central Channel of the USSR.

In 1993 he was elected to be a Deputy of the Russian Duma.

References

External links
  Kashpirovskiy's personal page

1939 births
Living people
People from Khmelnytskyi, Ukraine
Russian people of Ukrainian descent
Liberal Democratic Party of Russia politicians
First convocation members of the State Duma (Russian Federation)
Faith healers
Hypnotherapists
Russian television personalities
Russian psychics
Russian hypnotists
Beslan school siege
Soviet psychics